Charles Passi is an Australian actor and musician from the Torres Strait Islands. His acting career began as a regular on RAN Remote Area Nurse. For this role he was nominated for the 2006 AFI Award for Best Lead Actor in a Television Drama. He was also a main cast member of Grace Beside Me.

References

External links
 

Australian male television actors
Living people
Torres Strait Islanders
Year of birth missing (living people)